The  Sedan Beehive stone huts are a provincial heritage site in Lindley in the Free State province of South Africa.

In 1950 it was described in the Government Gazette as

They include some of the best-preserved examples of these huts. The walls were built of stones packed without any mortar in such a manner that successive courses overlapped inwards until the opening at the apex was small enough to be closed by a single large slab. For obvious reasons, the huts were generally small.

See also
Beehive house

References

Archaeological sites in South Africa
Buildings and structures in the Free State (province)
Former populated places in South Africa
Huts
Ruins in South Africa
Historic sites in South Africa